Art Halliwell (February 13, 1897 – May 18, 1964) was a Canadian soccer player who played as a goalkeeper at the international level with Canada.

Club career 
Halliwell was born in England and emigrated to Canada in 1903 along with his parents. In 1914, he played with Toronto Ulster United. In 1920, he played abroad in the United States with Merchants Shipbuilding F.C.. He played in several friendly matches against the Scottish Football Association's representative teams in 1921. In late 1921, he played in the Scottish Football League Second Division with Dunfermline Athletic where he appeared in five matches.

He represented Ontario in several friendly matches against The Football Association's touring teams and against Corinthian F.C. in 1924, and 1926. In 1926, he played in the Toronto Senior League with Toronto Craigavon. In 1927, played in the National Soccer League with Toronto Scottish. Throughout his tenure with Toronto he assisted in securing the Ontario Cup twice (1928, and 1931) and featured in the Dominion Cup finals against Westminster Royals in 1931.

In 2001, he was inducted into the Canada Soccer Hall of Fame.

International career 
Halliwell made his debut for the Canada national team on June 27, 1925 against the United States, and made another appearance against United States on November 8, 1925.

Managerial career 
Halliwell served as the head coach in 1925 for the University of Toronto soccer team and secured five championships (1929, 1931, 1932, 1933, and 1935). In 1947, he served as the club president for former club Toronto Ulster United in the National Soccer League.

Personal life 
Halliwell died on May 18, 1964 in Toronto, Ontario. A businessman, he became a millionaire through his ownership of gas stations and horse racing.

References

External links
 / Canada Soccer Hall of Fame

1897 births
1964 deaths
Canadian soccer players
Footballers from Greater Manchester
Soccer players from Toronto
Association football goalkeepers
Canada men's international soccer players
Canada Soccer Hall of Fame inductees
Canadian National Soccer League players
Scottish Football League players
Toronto Ulster United players
Dunfermline Athletic F.C. players
Toronto Scottish players
Canadian soccer coaches